Kurt Baumeister is an American novelist, essayist, critic, and poet. His debut novel, a satirical thriller entitled Pax Americana (Stalking Horse Press, 2017) was selected as a Best Book of 2017 by [PANK] Magazine. He has written for Salon, Rain Taxi, Electric Literature, Guernica, Entropy, The Nervous Breakdown, The Rumpus, The Good Men Project, and others. He has an MFA in creative writing from Emerson College and is a contributing editor at The Weeklings. "Review Microbrew," his review column, is published by The Nervous Breakdown. Baumeister is an editor with 7.13 Books in Brooklyn, NY.

National Book Critics Circle Award winner Darin Strauss says Baumeister “has more fun with language than any novelist since Money-era Martin Amis. I haven't read such marvelously obsessive prose in years.” The New York Times bestselling novelist and book critic Caroline Leavitt writes: "the thriller's been reinvented, smartened up, and rendered blazingly funny in Kurt Baumeister's wild, raucous ride of a novel. Spiritual, sly, and so fast-paced you could get whiplash. Truly, Pax Americana is hilarity with heart." About Pax Americana, John Domini writes: "Baumeister succeeds in delivering the deep chill he intends: that of a world in which "evil and… good… were just as passé as faith." Pax Americana was called "a true triumph” by The Brooklyn Rail, a "zestful, remorseless, clear-eyed debut" by Electric Literature, "a brilliantly imagined satire” by Largehearted Boy, and an "impressively creative blend of political intrigue and sci-fi drama” by Kirkus Reviews.

Baumeister's fiction combines literary fiction, surrealism, satire, and slipstream (science fiction, fantasy, spy fiction, and crime fiction, primarily); and is influenced by the work of Martin Amis, Kurt Vonnegut, Don DeLillo, and Vladimir Nabokov. His nonfiction often focuses on geopolitics, popular culture, and America's place in the world, as in his broadly published essay on AMC's Mad Men, which was referenced in Mad Men: The Death and Redemption of American Democracy.

Baumeister also curates the "Under the Influence" feature for Entropy and conducts the 'Six Ridiculous Questions" interview series for Volume 1 Brooklyn. He is currently at work on a novel, the mythocomic crime fantasy Twilight of the Gods (formerly entitled The Book of Loki).

Selected bibliography 

 Pax Americana (Stalking Horse Press, 2017)
 "'Mad Men' eulogies: Don Draper, American anti-hero"
 "Success and Its Trappings"
 “Review: Station Eleven by Emily St. John Mandel” https://electricliterature.com/review-station-eleven-by-emily-st-john-mandel-840951f6accf
 "The Book of Loki"

References

External links 

 Official website
 Contributor's page at Salon
 Contributor's page at Electric Literature
 Contributor's page at The Weeklings
 Contributor's page at The Rumpus
 Interview with Kurt Baumeister at Rain Taxi
Kurt Baumeister interviewed by Caroline Leavitt
Kurt Baumeister interviewed by Matthew Norman 
Kurt Baumeister interviewed by bestselling author Christine Sneed

Living people
American satirical novelists
Year of birth missing (living people)